Walker Brook is a stream in Clearwater County, Minnesota, United States.

Walker Brook was named for Thomas Barlow Walker, a businessperson in the lumber industry.

See also
List of rivers of Minnesota

References

Rivers of Clearwater County, Minnesota
Rivers of Minnesota